Gilbert Lake may refer to:
 Gilbert Lake (New York), a lake in Otsego County, New York
 Gilbert Lake (sound engineer), American sound engineer

See also
 Gilbert Lake State Park, Otsego County, New York